Ragnhild Butenschøn, née Jakhelln (21 September 1912 – 3 September 1992) was a Norwegian sculptor. She was especially known for her church art.

Personal life
She was born in Kristiania (now Oslo), Norway, She was a daughter of major Alf Jakhelln (1883–1947) and Agnes Prebensen (1884–1923).  After he mother's death when she was eleven, she was raised by an uncle and aunt in Østerdalen. She was trained in Budapest by Vilmos Aba-Novák in 1934 and at the Norwegian National Academy of Craft and Art Industry (Statens håndverks- og kunstindustriskole) by Wilhelm Rasmussen. She also took a summer course with Per Palle Storm.

In 1936 she married publisher Barthold A. Butenschøn with whom she had five children. She was a daughter-in-law of Barthold A. Butenschøn, Sr., and the mother of Hans Barthold Butenschøn, Peter Butenschøn and Nils Butenschøn.

Career
Her sculptures include the bronze fountain Dansende jenter  at Slemmestad from 1958, the bronze sculpture Rosepiken in Molde from 1971, and  the steel sculpture Flyktningemor at Riksgalleriet from 1971. Her bronze in St. Mary-le-Bow Church in London is a memorial to the fallen in the Norwegian resistance movement during World War II. The artwork featuring Saint George and the Dragon  was unveiled by King Olav V of Norway in 1966. She also delivered decorations to several Norwegian churches, including  Hamar Cathedral and   Fredrikstad Cathedral as well as at the National Gallery in  Oslo. She was awarded the King's Medal of Merit in 1985. She died during 1992 at Ytre Enebakk in Akershus, Norway.

Selected works
  Altertavle (1953) Helgøya kapell, Ringsaker
  Frans av Assisi preker for fuglene (1955) St. Hallvard's Church and Monastery, Oslo
  Dansende jenter (1958) Slemmestad
  St. Olav til hest (1964) Olav Chapel, Sandefjord
  Monument over Henrik Sørensen (1968)  Lillestrøm
  Maria bebudelse (1975) Torshov Church, Oslo
  Livets tr (1979) Asker Church in Akershus
  Hellig Olav (1984) St. Olav's Cathedral, Oslo
  St. Dominikus (1988) Lunden kloster, Oslo

References

1912 births
1992 deaths
People from Østerdalen
Oslo National Academy of the Arts alumni
Artists from Oslo
Norwegian women artists
Norwegian women sculptors
20th-century Norwegian sculptors
20th-century Norwegian women artists